Gyanpur Road railway station is a small railway station in Gyanpur town of Bhadohi district in Uttar Pradesh. Its code is GYN. It serves Gyanpur town. The station consists of two platforms. The platforms are not well sheltered. It lacks many facilities including water and sanitation.

Trains

 Lokmanya Tilak Terminus–Darbhanga Pawan Express
 Swatantra Senani Superfast Express
 Bhrigu Superfast Express
 Ernakulam–Patna Express (via Tirupati)
 Deekshabhoomi Express
 Rameswaram–Manduadih Express
 Lichchavi Express
 Raxaul–Lokmanya Tilak Terminus Antyodaya Express
 Pune–Manduadih Gyan Ganga Express
 Pune–Darbhanga Gyan Ganga Express
 Chauri Chaura Express
 Udhna–Danapur Express
 Manduadih–New Delhi Superfast Express
  Manduadih–Jabalpur Express
 Vibhuti Express
 Secunderabad–Danapur Express
 Ahmedabad–Patna Weekly Express

References

Railway stations in Sant Ravidas Nagar(Bhadohi) district
Varanasi railway division